Tam Kỳ  is the capital city of Quảng Nam Province, in the South Central Coast of Vietnam.

History

The town was established in 1906 under the Nguyễn dynasty as an administrative and tax post. During the Republic of Vietnam, the city was the main base of the US military in Quảng Nam Province (what was then Quảng Tín Province) for the war in Vietnam. The North Vietnamese captured the city on March 24, 1975.

In 1997, the local government under the Socialist Republic of Vietnam made it the capital of Quảng Nam province. Since then, there has been substantial development within the city. Tam Kỳ city is famous for Tam Kỳ chicken rice, which is recognized nationally, and many pristine beaches. In addition, Tam Kỳ city is also famous for Tam Kỳ noodles, which is known as My Quang.

Climate

Transportation

The city is served by Tam Kỳ Railway Station, which is connected to all major cities across Vietnam. Da Nang International Airport is 70 km from the city, which is a one and a half hours' drive. The closer Chu Lai International Airport is 30 km away. There is a free daily shuttle bus between the airport and Quảng Ngãi city center. Other means of transportation include regular car and bus services.

Notable people 

 Julie Yip-Williams (1976-2018), American lawyer, memoirist, born in Tam Kỳ.

Gallery

References

External links

 
Districts of Quảng Nam province
Populated places in Quảng Nam province
Provincial capitals in Vietnam
Cities in Vietnam